Julije Drohobeczky (5 November 1853 – 11 February 1934) was a Ruthenian and Croatian Greek Catholic hierarch. He was the bishop from 1891 to 1917 (in fact – until 1914) of the Eastern Catholic Eparchy of Križevci. From 1917 he was the titular bishop of Polybotus.

Born in Gany, near Uzhhorod, Austrian Empire (present day – Ukraine) in 1853, he was ordained a priest on 27 March 1881 for the Ruthenian Catholic Eparchy of Mukacheve. Fr. Drohobeczky was active in popular education and local politic in Zakarpattia.

He was confirmed as the Bishop by the Holy See on 17 December 1891. He was consecrated to the Episcopate on 26 May 1892. The principal consecrator was Bishop Yuliy Firtsak and co-consecrators were Bishop Ján Vályi and Bishop Mihail Pavel.

He died in Strmac Pribićki, Kingdom of Yugoslavia (present day – Croatia) on 11 February 1934.

References 

1853 births
1934 deaths
19th-century Eastern Catholic bishops
20th-century Eastern Catholic bishops
Croatian Eastern Catholics
Croatian people of Rusyn descent
Ruthenian Catholic bishops
Greek Catholic Church of Croatia and Serbia